Benjamin Tichborne (circa 1598 – by September 1661) was an English lawyer and politician who sat in the House of Commons from 1626 to 1629.

Tichborne was the son of Sir Walter Tichborne, of Aldershot, Hampshire. He subscribed at Oxford University on 3 December 1613. He was of Frimley, Surrey, when called to the bar at Middle Temple in 1625. In 1626, he was elected Member of Parliament for Petersfield and for St Ives and chose to sit for Petersfield. In 1628 he was re-elected MP for Petersfield and sat until 1629 when King Charles decided to rule without parliament for eleven years.
 
Tichborne was known to be alive in 1658, but had died by September 1661.

References

1598 births
Year of death missing
English lawyers
Alumni of the University of Oxford
Members of the Middle Temple
English MPs 1626
English MPs 1628–1629